The University of Evansville (UE) is a private university in Evansville, Indiana. It was founded in 1854 as Moores Hill College. The university operates a satellite center, Harlaxton College, in Grantham, England. UE offers more than 80 different majors and areas of study, each housed within three colleges and one school within the university: the Schroeder School of Business, the College of Education and Health Sciences, the College of Engineering and Computer Science, and the William L. Ridgway College of Arts and Sciences. The school is affiliated with the United Methodist Church.

Total enrollment (including full and part-time, undergraduate, adult, graduate, and UE students at Harlaxton) is 2,443 students, although full-time undergraduate and Doctor of Physical Therapy enrollment is 1,976 students. The student body represents 55 countries and 44 states with international students comprising 16% of the undergraduate student population. The university also hosts more than 155 student organizations and an active Greek community. UE athletic teams participate in Division I of the NCAA and are known as the Purple Aces. Evansville is a member of the Missouri Valley Conference.

Notable alumni include prominent entertainers, writers, and sports stars such as actors Rami Malek and Kelli Giddish, producer/writer Matt Williams, and basketball coach Jerry Sloan, as well scientists, business people, and others.

History

The University of Evansville began in 1854 when Moores Hill Male and Female Collegiate Institute was founded by John Moore in the small town of Moores Hill in southeastern Indiana. The first college building at Moores Hill, Moore Hall, was completed on December 1, 1856, although the opening day of classes for the new college was held in the unfinished building on September 9. The institution struggled financially during its time in Moores Hill, and a fire destroyed Moore Hall in 1915. The institution continued to operate in a second building, Carnegie Hall, until the move to Evansville. The former campus in Moores Hill continued operation as an elementary and high school. Carnegie Hall is now maintained as a museum.

On March 21, 1917, George S. Clifford made a presentation at a special session of the Indiana Conference of the Methodist Church, suggesting that the college be moved to Evansville, Indiana. Clifford produced a map that highlighted a lack of colleges in the Evansville area. After some deliberation and the city of Evansville raising $514,000 for the college, it was relocated to Evansville in 1919 and renamed Evansville College. It operated in temporary quarters in downtown Evansville until Administration Hall (now Olmsted Hall) was completed in 1922. This is the only building remaining on campus from before World War II.

In the period from World War II to 1960, Evansville College grew significantly. Enrollment grew from about 400 during the Great Depression to 1,500 in 1946. Also following the war, the Science and Engineering Building and Alumni Memorial Union were commissioned. The Clifford Memorial Library was completed in 1957. Five residence halls were built between 1958 and 1967, along with a fitness center, dining hall, and an art building. In 1967, due to the institution's growth and organizational changes, the name was changed to the University of Evansville with the approval of the Indiana State General Assembly. Also in 1967, a new theater building, Hyde Hall, housing Shanklin Theater was finished.

In 2010 The University of Evansville completed early its Endowment Campaign to raise $80 million after having raised an additional $60 million five years previous to the new campaign. On July 1, 2018, Christopher M. Pietruszkiewicz became the University of Evansville's 24th president.

Academics

Accreditation
The electrical and mechanical engineering programs have been continuously accredited by ABET (the Accreditation Board for Engineering and Technology) since 1970, and the civil engineering and computer engineering programs since 1997. The School of Business Administration is accredited by the Association to Advance Collegiate Schools of Business and provides a variety of professional programs in accounting, economics, finance, global business, management or marketing. The Department of Music is accredited by the National Association of Schools of Music (NASM). The Exercise Science major is endorsed by the American College of Sports Medicine (ACSM) and the National Strength and Conditioning Association (NSCA). The Dunigan Family Department of Nursing is accredited by the Indiana State Board of Nursing and the Accreditation Commission for Education in Nursing, Inc.  UE Nursing offers direct entry and study abroad experiences in England and China.

Rankings
In 2022, U.S. News & World Report ranked the University of Evansville against other regional Midwest universities, awarding it #7 overall, #3 for veterans, and #12 for value. It called the school's admissions policy "more selective."

Colleges and schools

The University of Evansville is academically organized into three colleges and three schools:
 William L. Ridgway College of Arts & Sciences contains these departments: archaeology and art history, art, biology, chemistry, communication, English, foreign languages, history, geography, law, politics and society, mathematics, music, philosophy and religion, physics, psychology, and theatre. This college also supports programs of study in biochemistry, classical studies, environmental science, international studies, and neuroscience.
 College of Education & Health Sciences contains the School of Education, the Dunigan Family Department of Nursing and Health Sciences, Physical Therapy, and the School of Public Health. Programs of study within Public Health include athletic training, clinical laboratory science, exercise science, health policy, health services administration, nutrition, sport communication, and sport management.
 College of Engineering & Computer Science contains the Electrical Engineering and Computer Science Department and the Mechanical and Civil Engineering Department.
 The Schroeder Family School of Business Administration contains the Department of Accounting and Business Administration as well as the Institute for Global Enterprise.

Harlaxton College
In addition to studying in the city of Evansville, the university's students can choose to study abroad in England at Harlaxton College, "The British Campus of the University of Evansville".  The college was formed and controlled by Stanford University prior to its passing to The University of Evansville. The college is located at Harlaxton Manor, about 115 miles north of London in Lincolnshire, a few miles away from the town of Grantham, England (home of Sir Isaac Newton and Margaret Thatcher and Thomas Paine). The study abroad program at the University of Evansville has consistently been rated as one of the best study abroad programs in the nation, ranked #1 in Europe and #7 globally.

Haralxton Bureau at Harlaxton College

On July 30, 1997, the now-closed student radio station 91.5 FM WUEV opened the former Harlaxton Bureau at Harlaxton College, Lincolnshire, England. Shortly thereafter, Harlaxton Bureau correspondents covered the death of Princess Diana and were subsequently recognized by the Indiana Society of Professional Journalists. This made the University of Evansville the first American to have a student-run news bureau on a foreign campus.

Theatre department
The UE theatre department features four mainstage and two studio productions a year, many taking place at Shanklin Theatre, which features a 482-seat thrust stage design extending into the audience on three sides. It also leads the nation in the top awards for its students as awarded by The Broadway Theatre Wing and other governing bodies of serious theatre. UE's alumni include Ron Glass, Jack McBrayer, Kwame James, Rutina Wesley, Crista Flanagan, Kelli Giddish, Carrie Preston, Rami Malek (winner of the Academy Award, Golden Globe Award, Screen Actors Guild Award, and British Academy Film Award for Best Actor), and Deirdre Lovejoy.

Athletics

The University of Evansville athletic teams have the nickname the Purple Aces (originally the "Pioneers").  Both men's and women's varsity sports play at the NCAA Division I level and compete in the Missouri Valley Conference, except for the men's swimming and diving teams which compete in the Mid-American Conference

Campus
The university campus is characterized by its grassy open spaces and tree cover. The university landscape is well maintained, and many students take advantage of the spacious lawns and large shade trees. The campus is bounded on the north by the Lloyd Expressway, the south by Lincoln Avenue, west by Rotherwood Avenue, and on the east by Weinbach Avenue. Walnut Street bisects the campus. Sesquicentennial Oval, the ceremonial entrance to campus, opens off of Lincoln Avenue. The oval was named in 2004 in commemoration of the university's 150th anniversary. The Schroeder Family School of Business, McCurdy Alumni Memorial Union, Sampson Hall / Mann Health Center, Hyde Hall, Olmsted Administration Hall, Clifford Memorial Library, and Koch (pronounced Cook) Center for Science and Engineering (all sectors of the original and later additional science/engineering buildings) surround Sesquicentennial Oval. Most of the buildings follow an old limestone motif, and renovations generally emulate the rest of the building.

The Administration Hall and the President's House and Circle were named to the National Register of Historic Places in 1983.

Koch Center was originally named the Engineering and Science Building when it was built in 1947. The motivation for the new building stemmed from WWII, after which UE expected a greater number of students to enroll with the intent of getting industrial degrees. After renovations in the late 1970s, the building was renamed in November 1984 in honor of Robert Louis Koch who had been a member of the UE Board of Trustees since 1968; Koch had recently given a donation to the university's New Century Capital Campaign that was being used to build a new library. (Not to be confused with the Kochs, Robert L. Koch was the chairman of the board of George Koch Sons, Inc.—an industrial company in Evansville—and son of Louis J. Koch, founder of the Holiday World amusement park.) Koch Center experienced another renovation, including a large new addition on its south side, in 2001.

In 2016, the Peters-Margedant House museum was moved to campus and then opened for tours in 2017.

Greek life
Sororities
 Alpha Omicron Pi 1951
 Chi Omega 1951
 Phi Mu 1952
 Zeta Tau Alpha 1964
 Alpha Phi 1974-1983 (closed)
 Delta Omega Zeta 2005 (local sorority on campus)

Fraternities
 Acacia 1950-1958 (closed)
 Sigma Phi Epsilon 1955
 Lambda Chi Alpha 1956
 Sigma Alpha Epsilon 1957
 Tau Kappa Epsilon 1957
 Phi Kappa Tau 1968
 Phi Gamma Delta 1997

Media
WUEV started in 1951, was a noncommercial, 6100-watt FM Radio station located at 91.5 MHz, owned and operated by the University of Evansville. WUEV also streamed online and became the first internet radio station in Indiana in 1996. The station was operated entirely by a student staff.

On May 17, 2019, the University of Evansville made what members of the Evansville community claimed to be a controversial decision to sell the students' station to WAY-FM, a non-profit nationwide network that plays contemporary Christian music.

While the story garnered national media attention from major media outlets and public scrutiny in support of the students and WUEV, the issue was brought to light in September 2018 when a group of University of Evansville alumni, community, and students began to uncover information that the University of Evansville previously had kept from the public as reported by WEHT News 25. While it seemed to the University of Evansville and Vice President for Enrollment & Marketing Shane Davidson continued to deny that a potential sale was being strongly considered in 2018, the University later admitted in 2019 the decision was made over a two-year study since 2016 which they previously never mentioned.

UE President Chris M. Pietruszkiewicz was said to have refused to meet with UE students who objected to the sale. This was an accusation made and observed publicly a number of times and never refuted by the President nor University. The community of Evansville and WUEV supporters rallied behind keeping WUEV through protests on campus and letter writing campaign. Students, alumni, and supporters also made a case that student DJs had been censored by the University of Evansville from speaking about the sale on the airwaves at WUEV to garner support from the community.

The University of Evansville went so far as in October 2018 to refute WUEV on-air claims of sale to the public with a press release. Earlier that fall in September 2018, an email from the University of Evansville Michael Austin was circulated email within the University of Evansville specifically saying that WUEV had already been sold. This email from Michael August was reported by both Courier & Press and InsideRadio.com.

According to a report from NPR, Tamara Wandel, a journalism professor at the University of Evansville, criticized the decision to sell WUEV, stating that it was made without input from the university's radio and television department.

Transparency and communication with students, staff, and faculty were highly criticized on the WUEV issue. "The sale of WUEV to Way-FM was not done with transparency or proper communication with students, staff, or faculty. The decision was made without input from the radio and television department," Tristan Richard, senior and general manager of WUEV told NPR.

Inside Higher Ed, the Washington, D.C.-based publisher covering higher education stories, reported that the proposed sale of WUEV would negatively impact the university's media and communications programs and reduce opportunities for hands-on learning.

Christopher M. Pietruszkiewicz, the president of the University of Evansville, told The New York Times in a February 25, 2019 article that he believed that U.E. could do without owning a radio station.

The FCC finalized the transfer of WUEV's license to WAY-FM on November 25, 2019. The terrestrial signal went silent at 11 pm CST. The final song played on WUEV was "Closing Time" by Semisonic. The station began broadcasting WAY-FM programming on November 26, 2019, and changed its call sign to WJWA on December 4, 2019.

Supporters of WUEV brought forth arguments that the University of Evansville had not followed proper FCC procedure with regard to the sale.

Notable alumni

Alumni include numerous prominent entertainers, sports stars, writers, and scientists. Among them are:
Richard Harbert Smith, professor and researcher of aeronautical engineering at MIT
 Matt Williams, producer and writer of The Cosby Show, Home Improvement, and Roseanne
Rami Malek, Emmy award winner for best drama series (Mr. Robot) and 2019 Golden Globe for Best Actor and Academy Award for Best Actor in a Leading Role for  Bohemian Rhapsody
Jack McBrayer, actor on 30 Rock
John B. Conaway, United States Air Force Lieutenant General
Jerry Sloan, NBA player and Hall of Fame head coach
David Weir, Scottish international soccer player
Marilyn Durham, novelist
Deirdre Lovejoy actress on The Wire
Lisel Mueller, poet who won the Pulitzer Prize for Poetry in 1997
Jim Michaels, Golden Globe nominee and NAACP Image Award-winning television producer (Supernatural, Everybody Hates Chris)
Ron Glass, actor on the TV series Barney Miller and Firefly
Carrie Preston, actress on a number of TV series including True Blood, The Good Wife, and The Good Fight
Toby Onwumere, actor on Empire and Sense8
Andy Benes, MLB pitcher, #1 overall draft pick (1988) 
Kyle Freeland, MLB top 10 draft pick, NL Cy Young top finisher and current pitcher for the Colorado Rockies
Kelli Giddish, actor and longtime star of Law & Order: Special Victims Unit
Crista Flanagan actor and commedian MADtv from 2005 to 2009, various roles in films made by Jason Friedberg and Aaron Seltzer, and her recurring role as Lois Sadler on the AMC series Mad Men
Jeff Galfer   actor, producer, and writer appearing in of Homeland, Hawaii Five-0, Steven Spielberg and Jason Blum's The River
 Tom Fischer stars in hit Netflix series *Heist (docuseries), also Bourbon and spirits writer, international whiskey expert

References

Bibliography
 Klinger, George; "We Face the Future Unafraid" (Evansville, Ind; University of Evansville Press, 2003).

External links

 
 Evansville Athletics website

 
Education in Evansville, Indiana
Universities and colleges affiliated with the United Methodist Church
University of Evansville
Educational institutions established in 1854
National Register of Historic Places in Evansville, Indiana
Tourist attractions in Evansville, Indiana
1854 establishments in Indiana